Wasif Manzil (also known as Wasef Manzil and New Palace) was built by Nawab Wasif Ali Mirza Khan under the direction and supervision of Mr. Vivian, officer of the Public Works Department of the Nadia Rivers Division and Surendra Barat, a Bengali engineer. This building, rather palace was used by the Nawab as his residence. The building is extremely close to the Hazarduari Palace. It is built on the Nizamat Fort Campus between the campus's Dakshin Darwaza (south gate) and the Hazarduari Palace, just opposite the campus's South Zurud Mosque and parallel to the Bhāgirathi-Hooghly River.

Geography

Location

Hazarduari Palace and its associated sites in the Kila Nizamat area (forming the central area in the map alongside) is the centre of attraction in Murshidabad. Just a little away are Katra Masjid, Fauti Mosque, Jama Masjid and the Motijhil area. There is a group of attractions in the northern part of the town (as can be seen in the map alongside). Some attractions such as Khushbagh, Rosnaiganj, Baranagar, Kiriteswari Temple, Karnasuvarna and others are on the other side of the river and there are attractions in the neighbouring Berhampore area also (not shown in the map).

Note: The map alongside presents some of the notable locations in Murshidabad city. Most of the places marked in the map are linked in the larger full screen map. A few, without pages yet, remain unmarked. The map has a scale. It will help viewers to find out the distances.

Destruction

The palace was extensively destroyed in the 1897 earthquake on 12 June. The whole of the palace's second storey came down within a few seconds. It was repaired later but without the second storey. Adjacent to the palace was an artificial hill and a landscape garden which now cease to exist.

Features
The palace has been designed to look a little like a castle with small corner turrets on the corners. The palace has a semi-circular pediment with the Nawabs of Murshidabad's coat of arms on it. Now, the palace is maintained by the Archaeological Survey of India and has been transformed into a museum. The palace has a garden space in front of it which has a fountain and several marble statues. The garden space is enclosed with a handsome iron railing. The main entrance is a Norman archway with open-work iron doors. The staircases and statues inside the palace are also made of marble and are worth seeing.

Wasif Manzil picture gallery

See also
 Nizamat Fort Campus and other buildings built in the campus:

 Hazarduari Palace
 Chawk Masjid
 Nizamat Imambara

 Nawab Wasif Ali Mirza Khan, the Nawab who built this majestic palace.

 Nawabs of Bengal and Murshidabad

References

Tourist attractions in Murshidabad
Palaces in West Bengal
Buildings and structures in Murshidabad district